The Triumph Tiger Cub was a  single-cylinder British motorcycle made by Triumph Motorcycles at their Meriden factory. Based on the Triumph T15 Terrier 150 cc, itself a surprise announcement just before the 1952 show, the 200 cc T20 Tiger Cub was designed by Edward Turner, and launched at the Earls Court show in November 1953. It competed well against the other small-capacity motorcycles of the time, such as those using two-stroke engines from Villiers.

Development
 
The first T20 Tiger Cub (1954-1956) was derived from the 150 cc Triumph T15 Terrier (1953-1956) with the same frame and forks.

The earlier version of the Cub used the Terrier's plunger rear suspension frame, but from 1957 this was updated to a more modern pattern of rear swinging-arm with twin suspension units. The ignition points were positioned in a 'distributor'-type device on the crankcase behind the cylinder.
A later development in 1963 was to site the points at a more conventional location on the end of the camshaft, accessed via a chrome cover below the base of the cylinder.

The Sports Cub designated T20SH featured slimline mudguards, no rear panelling or headlamp nacelle and with a higher compression ratio and other engine modifications were timed at 74 mph mean maximum by Motor Cycle magazine.

Off-road versions produced with high level exhaust, altered suspension and studded tyres, were designated TS20 Scrambles Cub and TR20 Trials Cub.
 
The last model made was the T20 Super Cub, which, for economy of production cost, used a basic frame and other parts common to the BSA Bantam D10 including larger diameter wheels with full-width hubs. Launched in November 1966, it was discontinued in 1968, being briefly replaced by the 250cc TR25W 'Trophy', based on BSA's B25 Starfire.

Unloved design features
The top frame tube of the Tiger Cub was lower than normal, leaving the headstock poorly supported. Some rigidity was recovered by internal bracing of the petrol tank. A plain bearing on the timing side main bearing sometimes wore rapidly. The primary chain ran in a shallow oil-bath but if the level dropped, the chain could suffer lubrication failure and stretch. The chain was not tensioned - and even worse, the primary chaincase on early models was a slightly 'waisted' shape. A worn chain could strike both the inside of the cover and the crankcase itself, making the oil-level even more difficult to maintain in the future.  Another common complaint was that the Cub would travel at highway speed (50 mph) for 1/2 hour and then stop unexpectedly. Some attributed this to overheating, but a cure was never found.

Legislative boost
In 1961, the driving licence law for Triumph's home market in Great Britain was changed, restricting learner motorcyclists to a maximum of 250cc. The Tiger Cub became one of the most popular ways of getting onto two wheels.

References

External links
 

Tiger Cub
Motorcycles introduced in 1954
Standard motorcycles